Jakov Grcić (born 12 April 1983), is a Croatian futsal player who plays for Futsal Dinamo and the Croatia national futsal team.

References

External links
UEFA profile

1983 births
Living people
Croatian men's futsal players